Dog Daze may refer to:
 Dog Daze (1939 film), an Our Gang short comedy film
 Dog Daze (1937 film), a Merrie Melodies cartoon